In some science fiction stories, total conversion may mean higher or complete conversion of matter into energy, or vice versa in some proportion of E = mc2.

Energy to matter conversion
Positron and electron production: For photons at high-energy (MeV scale and higher), photon–photon collisions can efficiently convert the photon energy into matter in the form of a positron and an electron:

 +  →   + 

Proton and antiproton production: Conventional matter consists of protons and electrons, with electrons having insignificant mass compared to protons. One conventional model for producing protons from energy is extremely high-energy cosmic ray protons colliding with nuclei in the interstellar medium, via the reaction:  +  A →  +  +  + A.  (A represents an atom, p a proton, and  an antiproton.) A portion of the kinetic energy of the initial proton is used to create two additional nuclei: another proton plus an antiproton.

Matter to energy conversion
Conventional nuclear reactions such as nuclear fission and nuclear fusion convert relatively small amounts of matter only indirectly into useful energy, such as electricity or rocket thrust. For electricity production released nuclear energy in the form of heat is typically used to boil water to turn a turbine-generator.

Possibly matter is almost completely converted into energy in the cores of neutron stars and black holes by a process of nuclei collapse resulting in: proton → positron + 938 MeV, resulting in a  >450 MeV positron-electron jet. Trace nuclei swept up in such a beam would achieve an approximate energy of (nucleus mass/electron mass) × 450 MeV, for example an iron atom could achieve about 45 TeV. An up to 45 TeV atom impacting a proton in the interstellar medium should result in the p + A process described above.

Ion-electron or positron-electron plasma with magnetic confinement theoretically allows direct conversion of particle energy to electricity by the separation of the positive particles from the negative particles with magnetic deflection. Direct conversion of particle energy to thrust is theoretically simpler, merely requiring magnetically directing a neutral plasma beam. Present lab production of relativistic 5 MeV positron-electron beams mimic on a small scale the relativistic jets from compact stars, and allow small scale studies how different elements interact with 5 MeV positron-electron beams, how energy is transferred to particles, the shock effect of gamma-ray bursts, and possible direct thrust and electricity generation from neutral plasmas. Lab positron-electron plasmas could be useful for studying compact star jets and other phenomena. However thrust generation or magnetically separating neutral beams for electrical generation will probably only be useful if there is a practical continuous process for generating neutral plasma by nuclear reactions.

References

Science fiction themes
Fictional technology